Haugland is a village in the municipality of Lurøy in Nordland county, Norway.  The village is located on the mainland coast, along the Aldersundet strait between the mainland and the island of Aldra.  Norwegian County Road 17 passes through the village.  Aldersund Church is located in Haugland, and it serves the eastern part of the municipality.

References

Lurøy
Villages in Nordland